Fosh or FOSH can refer to:
 The Fosh (Star Wars), a fictional race in the Star Wars universe
 Fosh (Haganah unit), an elite Jewish strike force
 Fosh (baseball), a type of baseball pitch
 Free and open source hardware
 Fosh, a surname
 Marc Fosh (born 1963), British chef
 Matthew Fosh (born 1957), British cricketer

See also 
 Foch (disambiguation)
 Foix, pronounced "Fosh" in Catalan, a commune in southern France